The 2007 Mosconi Cup, the 14th edition of the annual nine-ball pool competition between teams representing Europe and the United States, took place 13–16 December 2007 at the MGM Grand in Las Vegas, Nevada.

Team Europe won the Cup for the first time since 2002, by defeating Team America 11–8. This was also the first time Team Europe won the title in the United States.


The teams

Results

Thursday, 13 December

Friday, 14 December

Saturday, 15 December

Sunday, 16 December

References

External links
Official website

2007
2007 in cue sports
2007 in sports in Nevada
Sports competitions in Las Vegas
December 2007 sports events in the United States
MGM Grand Las Vegas